Blue Ball may refer to:

Populated places 
In the United States
Blue Ball, Arkansas, an unincorporated community
Blue Ball, Delaware, an unincorporated community
Blue Ball Village, Maryland, an unincorporated community
Blue Ball, Ohio, a community in Middletown
Blue Ball, Pennsylvania, an unincorporated community

Elsewhere
 Blue Ball, County Offaly, Ireland

Other meanings 
The Blue Ball, a 1995 play by Paul Godfrey
 Blue balls, testicular discomfort
 Blue Ball Inn, a pub in Cambridgeshire, England

See also 
Big Blue Ball, an album by Peter Gabriel and others